Shawnee Creek may refer to:

Shawnee Creek (Apple Creek), a stream in Missouri
Shawnee Creek (Baileys Creek), a stream in Missouri